The Master of Offida (active mid to late 14th century) was an anonymous painter active in the towns of Offida and Ascoli Piceno in the Marche.

He painted circa 1360-1370 frescoes in the church and crypt of Santa Maria della Rocca in Offida, depicting prophets and saints including a Santa Caterina di Alessandria, but also an "Annunciation, a "Madonna del Latte.

Frescoes in the church of San Vittore in Ascoli Piceno, are attributed to this painter. A folding tablet of tempera on gilded wood at the Fogg Art Museum depicting The Virgin and Child Enthroned; Christ on the Cross between the Virgin and Saint John the Evangelist has been attributed to the painter.

References

14th-century Italian painters
Offida